Croker Passage is a passage lying between the Christiania Islands and Two Hummock Island to the east, and Hoseason Island and Liège Island to the west, in the Palmer Archipelago. The northern entrance of this passage was very roughly charted and named "Croker Inlet" by Henry Foster in 1829, for John W. Croker (1780–1857), Secretary to the Admiralty at that time. The name has since been applied to the whole of this deep water passage, which provides an alternative entrance to the northern end of Gerlache Strait.

References
 

Straits of the Palmer Archipelago
Liège Island